Hauptbootsmann  (HptBtsm or in lists HB) designates in the German Navy of the Bundeswehr a military person or member of the armed forces. It belongs to the particular rank group Senior NCOs with port épée.

According to the salary class it is equivalent to the Officer Aspirant (OA – de: Offizieranwärter) rank Oberfähnrich zur See (Marine) and to and Hauptfeldwebel of Heer or Luftwaffe. It is grouped as OR7 and OR-8 in NATO, equivalent to First Sergeant, Master Sergeant, or Senior Chief Petty Officer in the US Armed forces, and to Warrant Officer Class 2 in the British Army and Royal Navy.

In navy context NCOs of this rank were formally addressed as Herr/ Frau Hauptbootsmann also informally / short Hauptbootsmann.

The sequence of ranks (top-down approach) in that particular group is as follows:
Unteroffiziere mit Portepee
OR-9: Oberstabsbootsmann / Oberstabsfeldwebel
OR-8: Stabsbootsmann / Stabsfeldwebel / Hauptbootsmann / Hauptfeldwebel
OR-7: Hauptbootsmann and Oberfähnrich zur See / and Hauptfeldwebel and  Oberfähnrich
OR-6a: Oberbootsmann / Oberfeldwebel
OR-6b: Bootsmann and Fähnrich zur See/ Feldwebel and Fähnrich
Remark
The abbreviation "OR" stands for "Other Ranks / fr: sous-officiers et militaires du rang / ru:другие ранги, кроме офицероф"!

See also

Equivalent in other NATO countries 
  – Premier-maître chef/ Eerste meester
  – Petty Officer 1st Class
  – Narednik
  – Oversergent
  – Premier maître
  – Επικελευστής/ Epikelefstis
  – Petty officer/specialist (after 6 years service)
  – capo di terza classe
  – Sergeant-majoor
  – no equivalent
  – Młodszy chorąży marynarki
  – Sargento-ajudante
  – Sargento primero
  – Chief Petty Officer/ Colour Sergeant
  – Chief Petty Officer/ Gunnery Sergeant

References 

Naval ranks of Germany